George Turner may refer to:

Sports
George Turner (footballer, born 1887) (1887–1958), English footballer
George Turner (footballer, born 1910) (born 1910), English footballer
George Turner (cricketer) (1858-1927), New Zealand cricketer
George Turner (cyclist) (1913–?), Canadian Olympic cyclist
George P. Turner, New Zealand rugby league international, 1957–1961
George H. Turner, New Zealand rugby league international, 1964
George Turner (rugby union, born 1855) (1855–1941), rugby union player for England, and St. George's Hospital Medical School RFC
George Turner (rugby union) (born 1990), Scottish international rugby union player with Glasgow Warriors
George Turner (basketball), American basketball player, drafted by Dallas and playing for Manila in 1986
George J. Turner (1873–?), president of the Amateur Athletic Union

Politics and law
George Turner (judge) (1750–1843), American Revolutionary War officer from South Carolina, judge in the Northwest Territory
George James Turner (1798–1867), English judge
George Turner (Nevada judge) (1828–1885), justice of the Territorial Supreme Court of Nevada
George Turner (American politician) (1850–1932), U.S. Senator from Washington
George Turner (Australian politician) (1851–1916), Premier of Victoria
George Turner (British politician) (born 1940), Member of Parliament
George N. Turner, Chief of Police for the City of Atlanta

Arts
George Turner (actor, born 1877) (1877–1947), American actor featured in Henry Steps Out, The Man from Toronto and The Diamond Man
George Turner (American actor), American actor known from Son of Zorro
George Turner (artist) (1841–1910), English landscape artist and farmer
George Turner (writer) (1916–1997), Australian science fiction writer

Others
George Turner (physician) (died 1610), English physician and alchemist
George Turner (priest), archdeacon of Oxford from 1783 till 1797
George Turner (missionary) (1818–1891), missionary on the Samoan Islands in the 19th century.
George Grey Turner (1877–1951), English surgeon
George Turner (architect) (1896–1984), American architect in Alabama
Sir George Turner (civil servant) (1896–1974), British government official
George B. Turner (1899–1963), American soldier and Medal of Honor recipient
George Townsend Turner (1906–1979), American philatelic bibliophile

See also
Vernon George Turner (fl. 1980s), Canadian ambassador to Israel and the Soviet Union